Phillip Anthony Livas (born April 24, 1989) is a former American football wide receiver. In 2011, he was signed by the Miami Dolphins as an undrafted free agent in 2011 before being cut before the start of the regular season, and the Omaha Nighthawks of the United Football League before being released later in the season. He signed with the Saskatchewan Roughriders in October 2012, but has since been removed from the roster. He played college football at Louisiana Tech.

Early years
Livas played football at South Terrebonne High School in Bourg, Louisiana for four years. He began his high school playing career as a starting safety in his freshmen year, but moved to the starting running back position for the remaining three years in high school. Livas was also the starting kick returner for South Terrebonne during his four years with the school. He received numerous individual awards including All-District honors (four times at kick returner and three times at running back), and first team All-State honors (once at kick returner and once at running back). Livas was the District 6-5A Offensive Player of the Year and the Houma Courier all-Regional MVP during both his junior and senior years. He ended his high school career in 2007 by helping to lead South Terrebonne High to the District 6-5A Title.

While at South Terrebonne High, Phillip Livas also played on the school's basketball team for three years and competed on the track and field team in the 100-meters race and for the 4x100-meter relay team. In his junior year, Livas's 4x100-meter relay team won the district and regional titles.

College career
After graduating in 2007, Livas attended Louisiana Tech University. Livas tied the NCAA record for most career touchdown returns with eight.

Professional career

Miami Dolphins
Livas signed as an undrafted free agent with the Miami Dolphins on July 26, 2011. In the Dolphins' first preseason game of the 2011 season, Livas handled the kickoff returns and punt returns for the team in the second half. Phillip Livas returned three kickoffs for a combined 84 yards and three punts for a combined 90 yards. Livas returned a punt 75 yards for a touchdown in the third quarter to help the Dolphins defeat the Atlanta Falcons 28–23. After handling most of the Dolphins' kickoff and punt return duties for the remainder of the preseason, Livas was cut by the Miami Dolphins on September 3, 2011.

Omaha Nighthawks
On September 6, 2011, Livas was signed by the Omaha Nighthawks of the United Football League.

Saskatchewan Roughriders
On October 3, 2012, Livas was signed by the Saskatchewan Roughriders of the Canadian Football League and placed on its Practice Roster.

Edmonton Eskimos
Livas was added to the Eskimos practice roster on July 2, 2013. He was released on July 12.

References

External links

 Edmonton Eskimos bio
 Louisiana Tech Bulldogs bio

1989 births
Living people
American football return specialists
American football wide receivers
American players of Canadian football
Louisiana Tech Bulldogs football players
Sportspeople from Houma, Louisiana
Players of American football from Louisiana
Canadian football wide receivers
Edmonton Elks players
Saskatchewan Roughriders players
Omaha Nighthawks players
Miami Dolphins players
Baltimore Ravens players